Kričanovo is a village in the  Bosnia and Herzegovina.

References

Populated places in Brod, Bosnia and Herzegovina